Large marine ecosystems (LMEs) are regions of the world's oceans, encompassing coastal areas from river basins and estuaries to the seaward boundaries of continental shelves and the outer margins of the major ocean current systems. They are relatively large regions on the order of 200,000 km2 or greater, characterized by distinct bathymetry, hydrography, productivity, and trophically dependent populations. Productivity in LME protected areas is generally higher than in the open ocean.

The system of LMEs has been developed by the US National Oceanic and Atmospheric Administration (NOAA) to identify areas of the oceans for conservation purposes. The objective is to use the LME concept as a tool for enabling ecosystem-based management to provide a collaborative approach to management of resources within ecologically-bounded transnational areas. This will be done in an international context and consistent with customary international law as reflected in 1982 UN Convention on the Law of the Sea.

Although the LMEs cover mostly the continental margins and not the deep oceans and oceanic islands, the 66 LMEs produce about 80% of global annual marine fishery biomass. In addition, LMEs contribute $12.6 trillion in goods and services each year to the global economy. Due to their close proximity to developed coastlines, LMEs are in danger of ocean pollution, overexploitation, and coastal habitat alteration. NOAA has conducted studies of principal driving forces affecting changes in biomass yields for 33 of the 66 LMEs, which have been peer-reviewed and published in ten volumes.

LME-based conservation is based on recognition that the world's coastal ocean waters are degraded by unsustainable fishing practices, habitat degradation, eutrophication, toxic pollution, aerosol contamination, and emerging diseases, and that positive actions to mitigate these threats require coordinated actions by governments and civil society to recover depleted fish populations, restore degraded habitats and reduce coastal pollution. Five modules are considered when assessing LMEs: productivity, fish and fisheries, pollution and ecosystem health, socioeconomics, and governance. Periodically assessing the state of each module within a marine LME is encouraged to ensure maintained health of the ecosystem and future benefit to managing governments.

Modules of Ecosystem Condition

Productivity 

The productivity of a marine ecosystem can be measured in several ways. Measurements pertaining to zooplankton biodiversity and species composition, zooplankton biomass, water-column structure, photosynthetically active radiation, transparency, chlorophyll-a, nitrate, and primary production are used to assess changes in LME productivity and potential fisheries yield. Sensors attached to the bottom of ships or deployed on floats can measure these metrics and be used to quantitatively describe changes in productivity alongside physical changes in the water column such as temperature and salinity. This data can be used in conjunction with satellite measurements of chlorophyll and sea surface temperatures to validate measurements and observe trends on greater spatial and temporal scales.

Fish and Fisheries 

Bottom-trawl surveys and pelagic-species acoustic surveys are used to assess changes in fish biodiversity and abundance in LMEs. Fish populations can be surveyed for stock identification, length, stomach content, age-growth relationships, fecundity, coastal pollution and associated pathological conditions, as well as multispecies trophic relationships. Fish trawls can also collect sediment and inform us about ocean-bottom conditions such as anoxia.

Pollution and Ecosystem Health 

Pollution and eutrophication can have significant impacts on ecosystem health and result in changing biomass yields. LMEs are emplaced in an effort to maintain healthy and sustainable conditions in spite of environmental change and global warming. A health ecosystem should maintain a relatively constant metabolic activity level, internal structure and organization, making it resistant to change over time. Health is assessed on both a population and species level. Observations are made pertaining to bioaccumulation of contaminants, frequency of harmful algal blooms and diseases, water column contents and water quality, reproductive capacity and more.  Eutrophication and nutrient overloading can be measured as a function of nitrogen and phosphate in a given location.

Socioeconomic 

By integrating socioeconomic metrics with ecosystem management solutions, scientific findings can be utilized to benefit both the environment and economy of local regions. Management efforts must be practical and cost-effective. The Department of Natural Resource Economics at the University of Rhode Island has created a method for measuring and understanding the human dimensions of LMEs and for taking into consideration both socioeconomic and environmental costs and benefits of managing Large Marine Ecosystems. This is especially important in island nations and small states which depend heavily on fisheries production for income.

Governance  

The Global Environment Facility (GEF)  aids in managing LMEs off the coasts of Africa and Asia by creating resource management agreements between environmental, fisheries, energy and tourism ministers of bordering countries. This means participating countries share knowledge and resources pertaining to local LMEs to promote longevity and recovery of fisheries and other industries dependent upon LMEs.

LMEs around the Globe 

 East Bering Sea
 Gulf of Alaska
 California Current 
 Gulf of California
 Gulf of Mexico
 Southeast U.S. Continental Shelf
 Northeast U.S. Continental Shelf 
 Scotian Shelf
 Newfoundland-Labrador Shelf
 Insular Pacific-Hawaiian
 Pacific Central-American Coastal
 Caribbean Sea
 Humboldt Current
 Patagonian Shelf
 South Brazil Shelf
 East Brazil Shelf
 North Brazil Shelf
 West Greenland Shelf
 East Greenland Shelf
 Barents Sea
 Norwegian Shelf
 North Sea
 Baltic Sea
 Celtic-Biscay Shelf
 Iberian Coastal
 Mediterranean Sea
 Canary Current
 Guinea Current
 Benguela Current
 Agulhas Current
 Somali Coastal Current
 Arabian Sea
 Red Sea
 Bay of Bengal
 Gulf of Thailand
 South China Sea
 Sulu-Celebes Sea
 Indonesian Sea
 North Australian Shelf
 Northeast Australian Shelf/Great Barrier Reef
 East-Central Australian Shelf
 Southeast Australian Shelf
 Southwest Australian Shelf
 West-Central Australian Shelf
 Northwest Australian Shelf
 New Zealand Shelf
 East China Sea
 Yellow Sea
 Kuroshio Current
 Sea of Japan
 Oyashio Current
 Sea of Okhotsk
 West Bering Sea
 Chukchi Sea
 Beaufort Sea
 East Siberian Sea
 Laptev Sea
 Kara Sea
 Iceland Shelf
 Faroe Plateau
 Antarctica
 Black Sea
 Hudson Bay
 Arctic Ocean

See also

 Ecoregion
 Marine ecosystem
 Marine life
 Large Marine Ecosystems Hub

References

External links

 Smithsonian Ocean Portal

Marine biology
Ecosystems
Fisheries science
Marine botany
Systems ecology